Abhipur is a town and municipal council in Mohali district in state of Punjab, near Chandigarh. It is the location of Indo Global Colleges.

References

Sahibzada Ajit Singh Nagar district